Year 925 (CMXXV) was a common year starting on Saturday (link will display the full calendar) of the Julian calendar.

Events 
 By place 

 Byzantine Empire 
 May 15 – Nicholas I Mystikos, twice the Ecumenical Patriarch of Constantinople and having reigned a second time since 912, dies at the age of 73.
 June 29 — Stephen II becomes the new Ecumenical Patriarch of Constantinople and head of the Eastern Orthodox Church, succeeding Nicholas I.
 Fall – John Mystikos, chief minister (paradynasteuon), is deposed and sent into exile in a monastery. He is replaced by the chamberlain (protovestiarios) Theophanes, who becomes the closest adviser of Emperor Romanos I. At this time the Byzantine Empire has been embroiled in a protracted and disastrous war with Tsar Simeon I of Bulgaria.

 Europe 
 Summer – King Fruela II dies after a reign of only 14 months. He is succeeded by his son Alfonso Fróilaz who ascends the throne. With the support of King Jimeno II of Pamplona (later Navarra), Sancho Ordóñez, Alfonso, and Ramiro (the sons of the late King Ordoño II) revolt and drive their cousin Alfonso to the eastern marches of Asturias, then divide the kingdom amongst themselves. Alfonso IV (the Monk) receives the crown of León, and Sancho I is acclaimed king of Galicia.
 Alberic I, duke of Spoleto, attempts to seize Rome on his own account. Pope John X organizes an uprising and expels him. Alberic flees to Orte, where he sends out messengers calling on the Magyars for assistance. But a mob in Orte, informed by papal agents, rises up and murders Alberic (approximate date).
 King Rudolph II of Burgundy (who also rules Italy) and his father-in-law, Burchard II of Swabia, lead a Burgundian expeditionary force over the Great St. Bernard Pass to confront Hugh of Provence. They head to the city of Ivrea where Rudolph's forces begin a civil war against Lombard partisans.
 Tomislav, duke of the Croatian duchies of Pannonia and Dalmatia, is crowned as king of Croatia. He forges an alliance with the Byzantines during the struggle with the Bulgarian Empire (approximate date).

 Africa 
 A Fatimid expeditionary force led by Jafar ibn Obeid lands in Abruzzo (Southern Italy). They overrun Apulia all the way to the city of Otranto. After defeating the Byzantine garrisons, the Arabs lay siege to the castle of Oria (which shortly after is destroyed). The defenders are massacred and the remainder (mostly women and children) are taken as slaves back to North Africa.

 Asia 
 Winter – Former Shu, one of the Ten Kingdoms in China, is invaded by Later Tang forces of Emperor Zhuang Zong, who incorporates the kingdom into his domains.
 A visiting Uyghur delegation spurs the development of Khitan small script, based on alphabetic principles (approximate date).

 By topic 

 Religion 
 Ha-Mim proclaims himself a prophet and a messenger of Islam, among the Ghomara Berbers near the city of Tétouan (modern Morocco).

Births 
 Basil Lekapenos, Byzantine chief minister (d. 985)
 Bruno I, archbishop and duke of Lotharingia (d. 965)
 Conrad I, king of Burgundy (approximate date)
 Conrad (the Red), duke of Lotharingia (approximate date)
 Fujiwara no Kanemichi, Japanese statesman (d. 977)
 Gerberga, Frankish noblewoman (approximate date)
 Gwangjong (Wang So), king of Goryeo (d. 975)
 John I Tzimiskes, Byzantine emperor (approximate date)
 Judith, duchess regent of Bavaria (d. 985)
 Li Fang, Chinese scholar and official (d. 996)
 Pan Mei, general of the Song Dynasty (d. 991)
 Qian Hongzun, heir apparent of Wuyue (d. 940)
 Thietmar, German nobleman (approximate date)
 Widukind of Corvey, Saxon chronicler (approximate date)

Deaths 
 May 15 – Nicholas I Mystikos, Byzantine patriarch (b. 852)
 August 3 – Cao, Chinese empress dowager
 December 10 – Sancho I, king of Pamplona
 December 28 – Wang Zongbi, general of Former Shu
 December 30 – Wang Shenzhi, founder of Min (b. 862)
 Alberic I, duke of Spoleto (approximate date)
 Bertha, duchess regent of Lucca and Tuscany (b. 863)
 Cathal mac Conchobair, king of Connacht
 Fruela II, king of Asturias and León
 Muhammad ibn Zakariya al-Razi, Persian philosopher
 Sueiro Belfaguer, Portuguese nobleman (b. 875)
 Zhao Guangyin, chancellor of Later Tang

References